Blackwood railway station served the village of Blackwood, South Lanarkshire, Scotland, from 1866 to 1965 on the Blackwood Junction to Alton Heights Junction Line.

History

First station 
The station was opened on 1 December 1866 by the Caledonian Railway. The station building was on the platform. The goods yard and the carriage sidings were to the west. The signal box was on the west side. In 1905 a new signal box opened, replacing the other. A new station opened on the Blackwood Junction to Alton Heights Junction line on 1 July 1905 and this station closed to passengers, but it stayed open to goods traffic until 1961.

Second station 
Coordinates:

The second station opened on 1 July 1905 by the Caledonian Railway, replacing the first site. It closed on 4 October 1965.

References

External links 

Disused railway stations in South Lanarkshire
Former Caledonian Railway stations
Beeching closures in Scotland
Railway stations in Great Britain opened in 1866
Railway stations in Great Britain closed in 1965
1866 establishments in Scotland
1965 disestablishments in Scotland